Harponville is a commune in the Somme department in Hauts-de-France in northern France.

Geography

History
The village of Harponville is first noted as belonging to the abbey at Saint-Riquier. Later it becomes a strongly Protestant place, owing to the Raincheval family's influence. Burials took place in the gardens of their home.
At the beginning of the 19th century, the cordiality between the two denominations was such that they decided to build a wall in the old parish church, Catholic on one side, Protestant on the other.
This wall was later demolished and a church for the Protestants was built in 1823 and rebuilt in 1863 after a fire. The village was unaffected by World War I. A defensive system of trenches and a blockhouse were set up in the ‘’Bois de l’Abbaye’’ near ‘’Mont d’Harponville’’ which kept the village safe.

Population

Places of interest
 The 19th-century church. The stone came from the former château of Harponville and the old abbey at Clairfaye
 19th-century Protestant church. (Permanent exposition inside)
 19th-century school

See also
Tiodave Sambé Destrotilles : 
- Professeur de Picard à l'université d'Amiens
- Chef d'entreprise en langue et culture picarde à Harponville
http://grebenote.com
- Chroniqueur d'actualités sur le web en langue picarde
http://nomdezeu.over-blog.fr

Sam Corwynn
- Luthier, musicien et sorcier à Harponville
https://web.archive.org/web/20130620183717/http://cor-wynn.com/
- Jardinier en permaculture à Harponville
https://web.archive.org/web/20130821010221/http://cor-wynn.com/atelier/pimpmingardin/

References

Communes of Somme (department)